Kankipadu is a suburb of Vijayawada and a  in Krishna District of the Indian state of Andhra Pradesh. It is also the mandal headquarters of Kankipadu mandal in Vuyyuru revenue division.

Geography
It is located 55 km towards west from district headquarters Machilipatnam. It has an average elevation of 6 metres (22 feet). It is Eastern end of Vijayawada .

Demographics
According to Indian census, 2001, the demographic details of Kankipadu mandal is as follows:
 Total Population: 	63,243	in 16,074 Households.
 Male Population: 	31,676	and Female Population: 31,567		
 Children Under 6-years: 7,166	(Boys - 3,635	and Girls - 	3,531)		
 Total Literates: 	39,781

Education
The primary and secondary school education is imparted by government, aided and private schools, under the School Education Department of the state. The medium of instruction followed by different schools are English, Telugu.

Transport
Vijayawada is the nearest city to Kankipadu. Vijayawada is 14 km from Kankipadu. There is a bus stand in the town. APSRTC runs buses from Kankipadu to different places in Andhra Pradesh. City buses run from Vijayawada to Kankipadu daily.

Notable Persons
Padma Bhushan K L Rao (Kanuri Lakshmana Rao - Famous Civil Engineer and MP[1962-67]

Padma Sri Kota Srinivasa Rao - Film Actor and MLA[1999-2004]

Annapurna - Film Actress

Girija [1938-95] - Film Actress

See also 
List of census towns in Andhra Pradesh

References 

Neighbourhoods in Vijayawada
Census towns in Andhra Pradesh
Mandal headquarters in Krishna district